Esmarch bandage (also known as Esmarch's bandage for surgical haemostasis or Esmarch's tourniquet) in its modern form is a narrow (5 to 10 cm wide) soft rubber bandage that is used to expel venous blood from a limb  (exsanguinate) that has had its arterial supply cut off by a tourniquet.  The limb is often elevated as the elastic pressure is applied. The exsanguination is necessary to enable some types of delicate  reconstructive surgery where bleeding would obscure the working area. A bloodless area is also required to introduce local anaesthetic agents for a regional nerve block. This method was first described by Augustus Bier in 1908.(Translated and reprinted in Survey of Anesthesiology 1967,11, 293-)

The original version was designed by Friedrich von Esmarch, professor of surgery at the University of Kiel, Germany, and is generally used in battlefield medicine. Esmarch himself had been Surgeon General to the German army during the Franco-German War. It consisted of a three-sided piece of linen or cotton, the base measuring 4 feet and the sides 2 feet 10 inches. It could be used folded or open, and applied in thirty-two different ways. An improved form was devised by Bernhard von Langenbeck later on.

Esmarch bandages are also used by cardiac surgeons in delayed mediastinal closure for patients who have experienced certain complications post cardiac surgery (e.g. myocardial oedema or severe postoperative bleeding).

See also 

Tourniquet
Amputation
Battlefield medicine

General references

Medical dressings
Military medicine